Sensei Redenshon is a 2013 action drama-martial arts film produced by Alejandra Sanchez Gruber and directed by independent Curaçaoan filmmaker German Gruber, Jr.

The film is entirely spoken in Papiamentu, but subtitles are shown and are available in both Dutch and English.

Synopsis 
After being released from prison, a man will have to fight his past to recover the love of his son. After his past in the world of Illegal Street fighting and gambling got him sentenced, Sandro comes out of prison searching to rescue the relationship with his only son. Shendel is about to turn 20; his obsession with easy money led him to follow his father footsteps into the world of underground fights. Shendel is about to take part in one of the tournaments. In order to protect his son and win back his trust, Sandro will have to confront his toughest test yet.

Cast
 Raul de Windt as Sandro
 Redfern Regales as Shendel
 Brian Pietersz as Alex
 Merietza Haakmat as Gabriela
 Milushka Birge as Vera
 John Zhu as Wang
 Rudolfo Valentino Croes as Bennie
 Eddie Kin Hong Wong as Sensei
 Steven Lacroes as Bara
 Benazir Charles as Chantal

Release
The film premiered in Curaçao and Aruba on 28 November 2013, at The Cinemas movie theaters in Willemstad and Oranjestad on the same day. It was then featured in theaters in Bonaire, Sint Maarten and the remaining Dutch Caribbean islands as well. After a year of featuring in various film festivals, the film premiered in the Netherlands on 24 September 2015 at the Pathé theaters in Amsterdam, Rotterdam and The Hague becoming the first Antillean film to be featured in Dutch movie theaters in 20 years. The film was also presented at various film festivals, including the Trinidad and Tobago Film Festival (Port-of-Spain), The America's Film Festival (New York City), Caribbean Film Festival (London), Curaçao International Film Festival Rotterdam (Willemstad), SCENECS International Debut Film Festival (Hilversum) and the World Cinema Film Festival (Amsterdam).

References

External links 
 Sensei Redenshon Official website
 

2013 films
Papiamento-language films
Curaçaoan martial arts films
Films set in Curaçao
2013 martial arts films